Durban City was a South African association football club based in the city of Durban.  Formed in 1959 by Norman Elliott, the club was dissolved in 1988.

History
Durban City FC played in the newly formed whites only National Football League from 1959 to 1977, the team then moved over to the Federation Professional League for the 1978 season. The team moved again to the National Premier Soccer League, which later changed its name to the National Soccer League from 1979 to 1988.

The club was sold on 27 July 1988 midway through the season to a group of local businessmen from the KwaZulu-Natal area. The new owners kept the famous blue and white hoops but immediately changed the name to Natal United. The team got relegated at the end of that season and disbanded.

In the 1986–1987 season the club courted controversy by becoming the first South African football club to have a mascot. 'Barry' was a kudu with enlarged eyes and glasses and was sponsored by a local opticians.

Notable coaches

  Colin Addison
  Clive Barker
  Alf Boyd
  Budgie Byrne
  Joe Kirkup
  Dave Sexton (guest)
  Bill Williams
  Butch Webster
  Willie Lewis

External links
 Durban City Football Club Official Website

 
Defunct soccer clubs in South Africa
Association football clubs established in 1959
Association football clubs disestablished in 1988
Soccer clubs in Durban
National Football League (South Africa) clubs
1959 establishments in South Africa
1988 disestablishments in South Africa
Soccer and apartheid